Ludwig Grillich (1855 – 21 May 1926) was a professional portrait photographer during the heyday of the Vienna pre-War period of the nineteenth century and had studios there and in Franzensbad. Some notables who appeared before his lens were Johann Strauss II, Johannes Brahms and Sigmund Freud. He was also responsible for a series of postcards depicting famous buildings in Vienna.

References 

Austrian photographers
1855 births
1926 deaths